The 1965 Pau Grand Prix was a Formula Two motor race held on 25 April 1965 at the Pau circuit, in Pau, Pyrénées-Atlantiques, France. The Grand Prix was won by Jim Clark for the third time in succession, driving the Lotus 35. Richard Attwood again finished second and Jochen Rindt third.

Classification

Race

References

Pau Grand Prix
1965 in French motorsport